In the history of ideas the New Learning in Europe is the Renaissance humanism, developed in the later fifteenth century. Newly retrieved classical texts sparked philological study of a refined and classical Latin style in prose and poetry. 

The term came to refer to other trends, one being the new formulation of the relationship between the Church and the individual arising from the Protestant Reformation. Contemporaries noticed this: Thomas Howard, 3rd Duke of Norfolk lamented "It was merry in England afore the new learning came up", in relation to reading the Bible.

An earlier 'new learning' had a similar cause, two centuries earlier. In that case it was new texts of Aristotle that were discovered, with a major impact on scholasticism. A later phase of the New Learning of the Renaissance concerned the beginnings of modern scientific thought. Here Francis Bacon is pointed to as an important reference point and catalyst.

See also
Renaissance of the 12th century
Greek scholars in the Renaissance
Renaissance Latin

Notes

Intellectual history
Renaissance humanism